Kråmyra Stadion was a football stadium in the city of Ålesund, in Norway that served as the home grounds for Aalesunds FK from 1977 until Color Line Stadium opened in April, 2005. It had a capacity of 11,000 people. The venue has hosted Norway national under-21 football team matches twice, playing 0–5 against Sweden on 8 August 1972 and 3–1 against Finland on 27 April 1982.

References

Defunct football venues in Norway
Eliteserien venues
Sports venues in Ålesund
1977 establishments in Norway
Sports venues completed in 1977